Thomas Robertson (September 13, 1852 – April 19, 1902) was a Canadian civil servant, entrepreneur and politician. Robertson was a Liberal member of Parliament for the electoral district of Shelburne in the House of Commons of Canada from 1878 to 1887, a Nova Scotia Liberal member of the Nova Scotia House of Assembly from 1894 to 1902, and Speaker of the Legislative Assembly in 1902.

Born in Barrington, Nova Scotia, the son of Robert Robertson and Sarah Richan, he worked in the provincial Department of Public Works and Mines and in the office of the provincial secretary as well as in the immigration branch of the federal Department of Agriculture. In 1884, he married Josephine Hume Allan. Robertson was president of the Barrington and Cape Island Steam Ferry Company and of the Coast Railway Company, nicknamed "Tom Robertson's Wheelbarrow Railway" and later taken over by the Canadian Northern Railway. He established a newspaper, the Cape Sable Advertiser, which operated from 1886 to 1890.

Robertson died in Dell Rapids, South Dakota, at the age of 49 while attempting to recover from an illness.

His son, Wishart McLea Robertson was a senator, Speaker of the Senate, and a minister without portfolio.

Electoral record

References
 

1852 births
1902 deaths
Canadian people of Scottish descent
Liberal Party of Canada MPs
Members of the House of Commons of Canada from Nova Scotia
Nova Scotia Liberal Party MLAs
Speakers of the Nova Scotia House of Assembly
People from Shelburne County, Nova Scotia